This is a list of children's animated television series (including internet television series); that is, animated programs originally targeted towards audiences aged 12 and under in mind.

This list does not include Japanese, Chinese, or Korean series, as children's animation is much more common in these regions.

Lists by decade
List of children's animated television series of the 1950s
List of children's animated television series of the 1960s
List of children's animated television series of the 1970s
List of children's animated television series of the 1980s
List of children's animated television series of the 1990s
List of children's animated television series of the 2000s
List of children's animated television series of the 2010s
List of children's animated television series of the 2020s

Animation-related lists
 
Children's